The 2nd British Academy Video Games Awards, awarded by the British Academy of Film and Television Arts, was an award ceremony held on 1 March 2005 at Café Royal in London. The ceremony honoured achievement in 2004 and was hosted by Jonathan Ross. Half-Life 2 was the major winner on the night, taking six out of the eight awards available.

Winners and nominees
Winners are shown first in bold.

Special Award (Games)
 Sam Houser
 Leslie Benzies

Games with multiple nominations and wins

Nominations

Wins

External links
2nd BAFTA Video Games Awards page

British Academy Games Awards ceremonies
2005 awards in the United Kingdom
2004 in video gaming
March 2005 events in the United Kingdom